The Robertson County Courthouse in Mount Olivet, Kentucky was built in 1870.  It was listed on the National Register of Historic Places in 1978.

It is a two-story "chaste yet straightforward Italianate building" designed and built by local builder G.M. Williams.

References

Courthouses on the National Register of Historic Places in Kentucky
Italianate architecture in Kentucky
Government buildings completed in 1870
National Register of Historic Places in Robertson County, Kentucky
1870 establishments in Kentucky
County courthouses in Kentucky